Special operations (S.O.) are military activities conducted, according to NATO, by "specially designated, organized, selected, trained, and equipped forces using unconventional techniques and modes of employment". Special operations may include reconnaissance, unconventional warfare, and counter-terrorism actions, and are typically conducted by small groups of highly-trained personnel, emphasizing sufficiency, stealth, speed, and tactical coordination, commonly known as "special forces".

History

Australia
In World War II following advice from the British, Australia began raising special forces. The first units to be formed were independent companies, which began training at Wilson's Promontory in Victoria in early 1941 under the tutelage of British instructors. With an establishment of 17 officers and 256 men, the independent companies were trained as "stay behind" forces, a role that they were later employed in against the Japanese in the South West Pacific Area during 1942–43, most notably fighting a guerrilla campaign in Timor, as well as actions in New Guinea. In all, a total of eight independent companies were raised before they were reorganized in mid-1943 into commando squadrons and placed under the command of the divisional cavalry regiments that were re-designated as cavalry commando regiments. As a part of this structure, a total of 11 commando squadrons were raised.

They continued to act independently and were often assigned at the brigade level during the later stages of the war, taking part in the fighting in New Guinea, Bougainville and Borneo, where they were employed largely in long-range reconnaissance and flank protection roles. In addition to these units, the Australians also raised the Z Special Unit and M Special Unit. M Special Unit was largely employed in an intelligence-gathering role, while Z Special Force undertook direct action missions. One of its most notable actions came as part of Operation Jaywick, in which several Japanese ships were sunk in Singapore Harbour in 1943. A second raid on Singapore in 1944, known as Operation Rimau, was unsuccessful.

Poland
On 20 September 1940 the Polish government in exile in London formed a special military unit in Britain with the soldiers called Cichociemni (silent and unseen) paratroopers to be deployed into Poland to help the resistance. The Cichociemni were trained similar to the early British Special Forces with each soldier receiving specialization training for their specific task of deployment to Poland through a paradrop as a special operation to sustain a Polish state through training the members of the resistance in fighting the German occupants. This included Operation Tempest and uprisings in Wilno, Lwów and 91 operators taking part in the Warsaw Uprising.

Previous to the formation of the GROM unit Polish special operations rescued six CIA, DIA and NSA officers from Iraq on 25 October 1990.

Japan
The Imperial Japanese Army first deployed army paratroops in combat during the Battle of Palembang, on Sumatra in the Netherlands East Indies, on 14 February 1942. The 425 men of the 1st Parachute Raiding Regiment seized Palembang airfield, while the paratroopers of the 2nd Parachute Raiding Regiment seized the town and its important oil refinery. Paratroops were subsequently deployed in the Burma campaign.

However, as with similar airborne units created by the Allies and other Axis powers, the Japanese paratroops suffered from a disproportionately high casualty rate, and the loss of men who required such extensive and expensive training limited their operations to only the most critical ones. Two regiments of Teishin Shudan were formed into the 1st Raiding Group, commanded by Major General Rikichi Tsukada under the control of the Southern Expeditionary Army Group, during the Philippines campaign. Although structured as a division, its capabilities were much lower, as its six regiments had manpower equivalent to a standard infantry battalion, and it lacked any form of artillery, and had to rely on other units for logistical support. Its men were no longer parachute-trained, but relied on aircraft for transport.

Some 750 men from the 2nd Raiding Brigade, of this group were assigned to attack American air bases on Luzon and Leyte on the night of 6 December 1944. They were flown in Ki-57 transports, but most of the aircraft were shot down. Some 300 commandos managed to land in the Burauen area on Leyte. The force destroyed some planes and inflicted casualties before they were destroyed.

United States
The decade 2003–2012 saw U.S. national security strategy rely on special operations to an unprecedented degree. Identifying, hunting, and killing terrorists became a central task in the Global War on Terrorism (GWOT). Linda Robinson, Adjunct Senior Fellow for U.S. National Security and Foreign Policy at the Council on Foreign Relations, argued that the organizational structure became flatter and cooperation with the intelligence community was stronger, allowing special operations to move at the "speed of war". Special operations appropriations are costly: Its budget went from $2.3 billion in 2001 to $10.5 billion in 2012. Some experts argued the investment was worthwhile, pointing to the raid in May 2011 that killed Osama bin Laden in Abbottabad, Pakistan. 

Indeed, that raid was organized and overseen by Admiral William H. McRaven, who was both a student and practitioner of special operations, having published a thesis on them in the 1990s.  McRaven's theory of special operations was that they had the potential to achieve significant operational, political, or strategic effects.  This potential required such units to be organized and commanded by special operations professionals rather than being subsumed into larger military units or operations, and required that "relative superiority" be gained during the special operation in question via characteristics such as simplicity, security, rehearsals, surprise, speed, and clearly but narrowly defined purpose.

Others claimed that special operations' emphasis precipitated a misconception that it was a substitute for prolonged conflict. "Raids and drone strikes are rarely decisive tactics and often incur significant political and diplomatic costs for the United States. Although raids and drone strikes are necessary to disrupt dire and imminent threats... special operations leaders readily admit that they should not be the central pillar of U.S. military strategy." Instead, special operations advocates stated that grand strategy should include their "indirect approach", suggesting that "the ability to operate with a small footprint and low-visibility, invest time and resources to foster interagency and foreign partnerships, develop deep cultural expertise, and rapidly adapt emerging technologies" was vital for maintaining deterrence and countering aggression. "Special operations forces forge relationships that can last for decades with a diverse collection of groups: training, advising, and operating alongside other countries' militaries, police forces, tribes, militias or other information groups."

Countries and units with special operation focus

Canada
Canadian Special Operations Forces Command (CANSOFCOM)  is a command of the Canadian Armed Forces. It is responsible for all special forces operations that are capable of responding to terrorism and threats to Canadians and Canadian interests around the world.

Canada's tier one unit is Joint Task Force 2 (JTF 2) is an elite special operations force of the Canadian Armed Forces, serving under the Canadian Special Operations Forces Command. JTF 2 works alongside many other special operations forces, such as Delta Force, Seal Team Six, and the British SAS and has distinguished itself as a highly-secretive, world-class special operations unit.

Ireland

The Army Ranger Wing is the special operations unit of the Defence Forces (Ireland).

Jordan
King Abdullah II Special Forces Group, commonly known as the JORSOF are strategic-level special forces of the Royal Jordanian Army under the Jordanian Armed Forces. Founded on April 15, 1963 on the orders of King Hussein, its primary roles include reconnaissance, counter-terrorism, search and evacuation, intelligence gathering combat, and the protection of key sites. The special forces group is also charged with carrying out precision strikes against critical enemy targets.

Poland
Special Troops Command (Pol.: Wojska Specjalne) is the fourth military branch of the Armed Forces of the Republic of Poland which includes the unit Grom and was officially formed in early 1990 after the fall of communism in 1989, in which the Polish Special Forces were first deployed into the conflict in Lebanon. The conflict in Lebanon was the first official battlefield experience in post-communist times.

Turkey
The Special Forces Command (Tur.: Özel Kuvvetler Komutanlığı – ÖKK) is the main special forces unit of the Turkish Armed Forces, under the direct command of Turkish General Staff. Unit is particularly active in battle against PKK. Turkish Navy also have a special operations unit, Underwater Offence (Tur.: Sualtı Taaruz – SAT). They have participated in the Turkish invasion of Cyprus.

United Kingdom
The United Kingdom Special Forces (UKSF) is a directorate comprising the Special Air Service, the Special Boat Service, the Special Reconnaissance Regiment, the Special Forces Support Group, 18 (UKSF) Signal Regiment and the Joint Special Forces Aviation Wing, as well as the supporting No. 47 Squadron. In UK law, "special forces" means those units of the armed forces of the Crown and the maintenance of whose capabilities is the responsibility of the director of special forces or which are for the time being subject to the operational command of that director. The British Army and the Royal Marines also have special operations-capable forces that do not form part of the UKSF.

United States
The United States Special Operations Command (USSOCOM or SOCOM) is the unified combatant command charged with overseeing the various special operations component commands of the Army, Marine Corps, Navy, and Air Force of the United States Armed Forces. The command is part of the Department of Defense and is the only unified combatant command created by an Act of Congress. USSOCOM is headquartered at MacDill Air Force Base in Tampa, Florida. Outside of the US military, the CIA SAC's Special Operations Group also conducts special operations missions as covert action represents an additional option within the realm of national security when diplomacy and military action are not feasible.

See also

 Airborne forces
 Commandos
 Covert operation
 Foreign internal defense
 Frogman
 List of military special forces units
 Long-range reconnaissance patrol
 Police tactical unit

References

Works cited

Further reading
 Capt. Malcolm Brailey, The Transformation of Special Operations Forces in Contemporary Conflict: Strategy, Missions, Organisation and Tactics. Canberra, ACT: Land Warfare Studies Centre, Working Paper No. 127, 2005. 
 Colin S. Gray, “Part III: Strategy and Special Operations”, Explorations in Strategy. Westport, CT: Greenwood Press, 1996, pp. 139–232.
 William H. McRaven, Spec Ops: Case Studies of Special Operations Warfare; Theory and Practice. Novato, CA: Presidio, 1995.
 Linda Robinson, One Hundred Victories: Special Ops and the Future of American Warfare, New York:  Public Affairs, 2013. .

External links
 List of US Special Operations Forces

Military operations
Special forces